, is a Japanese metal idol group that was founded in 2013.

History 
Passcode was formed in Osaka in 2013 and consists of the four vocalists Nao Minami, Kaede Takashima, Emily Arima and Hinako Ōgami. Passcode is supported by a backup band.

After releasing several singles and albums on smaller labels, the group signed to Universal Music Japan and released their second full-length album Zenith in 2017. In 2018 the band signed with British record label JPU Records and released a best-of record called Ex Libris Passcode in Europe.

Their song "Ichika Bachika" became the opening song for the second season of the live-action film adaption of Kakegurui. In June 2020, their ninth single "Starry Sky" debuted at number 1 on the Japanese Oricon weekly singles chart and the Billboard Japan Top Singles Sales chart, selling over 7,000 units in its first week after release.

Musical style 
The musical style of Passcode can be described as kawaii metal. Some vocalists use harsh vocals next to cleans. Yuna Imada contributed the harsh vocals before her retirement in 2021, with the job now handled by former Ladybaby member Emily Arima. Kaede Takashima uses the harsh vocals in some tracks like "Taking You Out" and "Club Kids Never Die". The band uses Auto-Tune while singing.

The band mixes metalcore with EDM and J-pop. The songs are written in Japanese language and contain English-language parts as well.

Members 
Nao Minami – vocals, and dancer (2013–present)
Kaede Takashima – vocals, and dancer (2014–present)
Hinako Ōgami – vocals, and dancer (2015–present)
 Emily Arima - vocals, and dancer (2021–present)

Past members
Reika Kanzaki – vocals, and dancer (2013)
Saki Sakurai – vocals, and dancer (2013)
Kyōko Kazuki – vocals, and dancer (2013)
Yūri Kurohara – vocals, and dancer (2013–2015)
Yuna Imada - vocals, and dancer (2014–2021)

Discography

Studio albums

EPs

Compilations

Live albums

Singles

DVD / Blu-ray

Music videos

Notes

References

External links 

Japanese idol groups
Japanese girl groups
Japanese women in electronic music
Japanese metalcore musical groups
Kawaii metal musical groups
Electronicore musical groups
Screamo musical groups
Musical groups established in 2013
Musical groups from Osaka
Vocal quartets
2013 establishments in Japan
Universal Music Japan artists